"She's Not Me" is a two–part song by Swedish singer Zara Larsson from her debut studio album, 1, her international debut EP, Uncover, and her second EP, Allow Me to Reintroduce Myself. The song was released digitally on 26 June 2013. Part one of the song peaked at number 21 in Sweden, and has been certified Gold by the GLF.

Music video
Music videos for parts one and two were released on 27 March 2013 and 17 June 2013, respectively.

Track listing

Charts

Weekly charts

Certifications

Release history

References

2013 songs
2013 singles
Zara Larsson songs
Songs written by Rickard Göransson